Political Affairs Magazine was a monthly Marxist publication, originally published in print and later online only. It aimed to provide an analysis of events from a working class point of view. The magazine was a publication of the Communist Party USA and was founded in 1944 upon the closure of its predecessor, The Communist, which was founded in 1927. Well-known editors of Political Affairs Magazine included V. J. Jerome, Gus Hall, Hyman Lumer, Herbert Aptheker, Gerald Horne, and Joe Sims. Other editors included Max Weiss. In 2016, the magazine stopped publishing articles and merged with People's World.

History
At its founding, Political Affairs was the theoretical organ of the Communist Party, USA, generally publishing articles intended almost exclusively for members of the Communist Party. In the late 1990s, that role changed. Political Affairs shed its role as an internal organ of the Communist Party and adopted a broader stance. It provides Marxist perspectives on many contemporary issues and engages in theoretical discussions relevant to Marxists and the labor movement. In addition to articles devoted to national and international politics, the magazine offers poetry, book reviews, occasional reviews of music and film, interviews, and occasional short stories.

The publication can be traced back to The Masses, the famous Greenwich Village paper of the 1910s. After being suppressed by the government, the paper continued as The Liberator. Independently of this, the Friends of Soviet Russia had established another monthly, Soviet Russia, in 1919. In 1924 the title was changed to Soviet Russia Pictorial. Finally, William Z. Foster had begun Labor Herald as the official publication of his Trade Union Educational League in March 1922. When the Workers Party of America had finally been consolidated as the unified above-ground Communist Party in the United States, it was determined that the party should have a theoretical monthly as well as a daily, in line with Lenin's guideline in What Is To Be Done? 

The above three publications were combined into Workers Monthly, which debuted in November 1924. It changed its name to The Communist in 1927 and to Political Affairs in 1944.

References

External links
Official website Archive
Political Affairs archive at the Internet Archive
Archive of Workers Monthly from November 1924 - February 1927
Archive of Soviet Russia Pictorial from January 1923 - December 1923
 Marxists Internet Archive: Political Affairs articles of 1945 after Browderism

Communist periodicals published in the United States
Monthly magazines published in the United States
Defunct political magazines published in the United States
Communist Party USA publications
Magazines established in 1944
Marxist magazines
Online magazines with defunct print editions
Magazines disestablished in 2016